The Muluridji are an indigenous Australian people of the state of Queensland.

Country
The Muluridji had an estimated (Norman Tindale) of territory, starting from the headwaters of the Mitchell River northwards as far as Mount Carbine. The eastern frontier ran to Rumula, while their southern boundary was on the Atherton Tableland at Mareeba. Their western limit was 'Woodville', mainly in the drier country west of the rainforest margin between Biboohra and Mount Molloy.

Social organization
One clan name at least survives:-
 Kokanodna.

Alternative names
 Muluridyi, Mulari-ji, Mularitchee, Mullridgey.
 Molloroiji.
 Moorlooratchee. (Wakara exonym)
 Koko-moloroitji, Koko-moloroiji.(Kokokulunggur exonym)
 Kokanodna.

Notes

Citations

Sources

Aboriginal peoples of Queensland